Eric P. Beaudoin (born May 3, 1980) is a Canadian former professional ice hockey forward. He played in the National Hockey League with the Florida Panthers.

Playing career
Born  in Ottawa, Ontario, Beaudoin started his hockey career in the OHL. He was drafted by the Tampa Bay Lightning in the 1998 NHL Entry Draft. He has played for the Florida Panthers in the NHL as well as several AHL teams. In the fall of 2005, he signed with the Newcastle Vipers, but was released from his contract for a one-month tryout with Jokerit in the Finnish SM-liiga.

When he was not signed on after the tryout, Beaudoin agreed to a subsequent two-game tryout with HPK that also did not lead to a contract. Eventually Beaudoin agreed to a contract for the rest of the season with Ässät, but instead signed with Mora IK in the Swedish Elitserien. He stayed in Mora for three years before signing a one-year contract with Swedish top-team Linköpings HC. After concluding a one-year contract with Linköpings, in May 2009, he signed another one-year term contract with Rögle BK.

Upon completion of his contract with Rögle, Beaudoin opted to switch leagues and joined EHC Biel of the Swiss National League A.

Beaudoin enjoyed parts of three seasons with Biel, before joining as a free agent to sign with German club, Straubing Tigers of the DEL on June 23, 2013. After just 10 games with the Tigers, Beaudoin opted for a release from his contract to return to Biel.

In the 2014–15 season, Beaudoin signed an optional two-year contract with Croatian club, KHL Medveščak Zagreb of the KHL. He played in three games in Zagreb before suffering a season-ending injury.

In January 2016, as a free agent, he inked a deal in a return to Switzerland with NLB club, EHC Olten for the remainder of the 2015–16 season. When Olten sacked head coach Heikki Leime during the playoff semifinal series in March 2016, Beaudoin took on head coaching duties alongside sport director Jakob Kölliker on an interim basis.

Career statistics

References

External links
 
 AHL.com article

1980 births
Living people
Canadian ice hockey forwards
Edmonton Road Runners players
EHC Biel players
Florida Panthers players
Franco-Ontarian people
Guelph Storm players
HPK players
Ice hockey people from Ottawa
Jokerit players
KHL Medveščak Zagreb players
Linköping HC players
Louisville Panthers players
Mora IK players
Newcastle Vipers players
EHC Olten players
Rögle BK players
San Antonio Rampage players
Straubing Tigers players
Utah Grizzlies (AHL) players
Canadian expatriate ice hockey players in England
Canadian expatriate ice hockey players in Croatia
Canadian expatriate ice hockey players in Finland
Canadian expatriate ice hockey players in Germany
Canadian expatriate ice hockey players in Switzerland
Canadian expatriate ice hockey players in Sweden